Gepard is a game engine for real-time strategy (RTS) video games developed by StormRegion.

Games using this engine  
 S.W.I.N.E. (2001)
 Codename: Panzers (2004)
 Rush for Berlin (2006)
 Joint Task Force (2006) 
 Codename: Panzers – Cold War (2009)
 S.W.I.N.E. HD Remaster (2019)

See also 
 StormRegion

References 

Video game engines